A stenosis (from Ancient Greek στενός, "narrow") is an abnormal narrowing in a blood vessel or other tubular organ or structure such as foramina and canals. It is also sometimes called a stricture (as in urethral stricture).

Stricture as a term is usually used when narrowing is caused by contraction of smooth muscle (e.g. achalasia, prinzmetal angina); stenosis is usually used when narrowing is caused by lesion that reduces the space of lumen (e.g. atherosclerosis). The term coarctation is another synonym, but is commonly used only in the context of aortic coarctation.

Restenosis is the recurrence of stenosis after a procedure.

Types
The resulting syndrome depends on the structure affected.

 Examples of vascular stenotic lesions include:
 Intermittent claudication (peripheral artery stenosis)
 Angina (coronary artery stenosis)
 Carotid artery stenosis which predispose to (strokes and transient ischaemic episodes)
 Renal artery stenosis

 The types of stenoses in heart valves are:
 Pulmonary valve stenosis, which is the thickening of the pulmonary valve, therefore causing narrowing
 Mitral valve stenosis, which is the thickening of the mitral valve (of the left heart), therefore causing narrowing
 Tricuspid valve stenosis, which is the thickening of the tricuspid valve (of the right heart), therefore causing narrowing
 Aortic valve stenosis, which is the thickening of the aortic valve, therefore causing narrowing

Stenoses/strictures of other bodily structures/organs include:
 Pyloric stenosis (gastric outflow obstruction)
 Lumbar, cervical or thoracic spinal stenosis
 Subglottic stenosis (SGS)
 Tracheal stenosis
 Obstructive jaundice (biliary tract stenosis)
 Bowel obstruction
 Phimosis
 Non-communicating hydrocephalus due to aqueductal stenosis
 Stenosing tenosynovitis
 Atherosclerosis
 Esophageal stricture
 Achalasia
 Prinzmetal angina
 Vaginal stenosis
 Meatal stenosis

Causes

 alcohol
 atherosclerosis causes stenotic lesions in arteries.
 birth defects
 calcification
 diabetes
 headbanging – as in the case of Dave Mustaine
 iatrogenic, e.g. secondary to radiation therapy
 infection
 inflammation
 ischemia
 neoplasm – in such cases, the stenosis is often said to be "malignant" or "benign", although this attribute actually refers to the neoplasm itself.
 smoking
 ureteral
 urethral

Diagnosis
Stenoses of the vascular type are often associated with unusual blood sounds resulting from turbulent flow over the narrowed blood vessel. This sound can be made audible by a stethoscope, but diagnosis is generally made or confirmed with some form of medical imaging.

See also
 Atresia

References

External links 
 
 

Gross pathology
Medical terminology